Somewhere in the City is a 1998 American indie comedy-drama film written and directed by Ramin Niami.

Cast 
 Sandra Bernhard as Betty 
 Ornella Muti as Marta
 Robert John Burke as Frankie
 Peter Stormare as Graham
 Bai Ling as Lu Lu
 Paul Anthony Stewart as Che
 Bulle Ogier as Brigitte
 Linda Dano as Television Producer
 Bill Sage as Justin 
 Kim Walker as Molly
 Ed Koch as himself
 Mohammad Ghaffari as Teddy

Soundtrack 
The score was composed by Welsh composer and recording artist John Cale, who performed it with Dawn Buckholz and Mark Deffenbaugh. The score was released alongside other songs used in the film on a soundtrack album in 1998.

References

External links

1998 films
American comedy-drama films
Films scored by John Cale
1998 comedy-drama films
Films directed by Ramin Niami
1990s English-language films
1990s American films